

Research history
Studies led by California Supreme Court Justice Goodwin Liu (2017) and the Center for American Progress (2019) provided in-depth statistics into the issue.

Judicial officers
This is a dynamic list of Asian Americans who are or were judges, magistrate judges, court commissioners, or administrative law judges. If known, it will be listed if a judge has served on multiple courts.

Other topics of interest 

 List of first minority male lawyers and judges in the United States
 List of first women lawyers and judges in the United States
List of African-American jurists
List of Hispanic/Latino American jurists
List of Jewish American jurists
List of LGBT jurists in the United States
List of Native American jurists

References

Sources
 Asian American Bar Association of The Greater Bay Area
APAs In The Judiciary Resource Page
Asian Americans and Pacific Islanders on the Federal Bench
Current Asian Pacific American Federal Judges
Selected APA Judges in California
 First Vietnamese American and Korean American Women Seated on State Judiciary, by Sam Chu Lin, AsianWeek, August 23, 2002
 Vietnamese American Facts, Tieng Magazine
 Two New APA Judges in Cook County, Illinois, AsianWeek, March 30, 2007

Asian-American issues
Jurists